Carlos Alberto Pairetti (17 October 1935 – 26 September 2022) was an Argentine racing driver. 

Pairetti was born in Clucellas, Santa Fe on 17 October 1935. He won the Turismo Carretera championship in 1968.

References

External links

1935 births
2022 deaths
Argentine racing drivers
People from Castellanos Department
Sportspeople from Santa Fe Province
Turismo Carretera drivers
World Sportscar Championship drivers